Carlos was a Belgian professional cycling team that existed from 1975 to 1979. Its main sponsor was bicycle company Carlos Cycles. The team competed in the 1979 Giro d'Italia, but did not have any wins.

References

Cycling teams based in Belgium
Defunct cycling teams based in Belgium
1975 establishments in Belgium
1979 disestablishments in Belgium
Cycling teams established in 1975
Cycling teams disestablished in 1979